Fred C. Cox (born 1961) is a Republican former member of the Utah State House of Representatives, representing the 30th District in 2015 to 2016 and the 32nd District from 2011 to 2012.

Early life and career
Cox is a Utah native and lifelong resident of Salt Lake County. He attended the University of Utah and Utah Technical College (now Salt Lake Community College), graduating with an Associate of Applied Science in Architectural Technology. He started his own architectural firm in West Valley City, UT in 1996.

Political career 
Cox has served as a State Republican Delegate beginning in 2002, is an elected member of the State Republican Central Committee representing Salt Lake County, served briefly as the Salt Lake County Republican House District 32 Chair, and has been a campaign volunteer and/or consultant for several state and local races starting in 1994. He has been involved in government affairs for both AIA Utah and ChamberWest Regional Chamber of Commerce along with church based community service.

Cox was originally elected to be the party nominee in a special election on January 6, 2011 to replace Ron C. Bigelow who announced on December 22, 2010 he was to be the Executive Director of the Governor's Office of Planning and Budget as of January 1, 2011.  Cox was appointed January 10, 2011 by Governor Gary Herbert and completed Bigelow's term for 2011 and 2012. In 2012 Cox ran for the new House District 30 against another incumbent Rep. Janice Fisher and lost in a close race. In 2014 Cox ran for the open seat against Michael D. Lee and won by a very slim margin.

During the 2016 Legislative session, Cox served on the Higher Education Appropriations Subcommittee, the House Government Operations Committee, and the House Judiciary Committee.

In 2019 and 2020, Cox was the original sponsor, one of five, for the 2019 Utah Tax Referendum. The bill, 2019 SB 2001 was later repealed by the legislature and Governor. 144,675 petition signatures were verified meeting the requirements in 26 of 29 counties with an estimate of between 152,000 and 170,000 signatures gathered. Verification was stopped.

In February 2020, Cox announced he was running for Salt Lake County District 2. In April he survived the Republican convention and is in the June primary.

2016 sponsored legislation 

Cox passed three of the bills he introduced in 2016. Two of the bills were added to other bills that also passed. He did not floor sponsored any Senate bills. Cox also passed bills in 2011, 2012 and 2015.

Elections

2014
In 2014, Cox ran for election in House District 30. He won the Republican Party nominee at the County Republican Convention on April 12, 2014 with 68.75% of the vote over Carbon Lundgren. He faced Michael D. Lee, Democratic Party Nominee, in the General Election in November. Cox was behind on election day but won by 47 votes, after 2 weeks when all the votes were counted. Final results were Cox 3,076 votes (50.38%) v Lee 3,029 votes (49.62%) out of 6,105 votes cast.

2012
Cox ran for election in House District 30 due to redistricting.  He ran unopposed in the County Republican Convention on April 21, 2012.  In the general election on November 6, 2012, Cox lost to another incumbent Rep. Janice Fisher, from House District 29. Final voting results were Fisher 5,385 votes vs Cox 5,029 votes, 11 write-in votes and 10,425 votes cast.

References

External links
State of Utah House of Representatives Fred C. Cox (R)
Legislative profile from Project Vote Smart
Biography from Project Vote Smart
Ballotpedia Fred Cox

Living people
Republican Party members of the Utah House of Representatives
1961 births
21st-century American politicians